In mathematics, a binary operation is commutative if changing the order of the operands does not change the result. It is a fundamental property of many binary operations, and many mathematical proofs depend on it. The name is needed because there are operations, such as  division and subtraction, that do not have it (for example); such operations are not commutative, and so are referred to as noncommutative operations. The idea that simple operations, such as the multiplication and addition of numbers, are commutative was for many years implicitly assumed. Thus, this property was not named until the 19th century, when mathematics started to become formalized. A similar property exists for binary relations; a binary relation is said to be symmetric if the relation applies regardless of the order of its operands; for example, equality is symmetric as two equal mathematical objects are equal regardless of their order.

Mathematical definitions
A binary operation  on a set S is called commutative if
 
An operation that does not satisfy the above property is called non-commutative.

In other words, an operation is commutative if every two elements commute.

Examples

Commutative operations

 Addition and multiplication are commutative in most number systems, and, in particular, between natural numbers, integers, rational numbers, real numbers and complex numbers. This is also true in every field.
 Addition is commutative in every vector space and in every algebra.
 Union and intersection are commutative operations on sets.
 "And" and "or" are commutative logical operations.

Noncommutative operations
Some noncommutative binary operations:

Division, subtraction, and exponentiation

Division is noncommutative, since .

Subtraction is noncommutative, since . However it is classified more precisely as  anti-commutative, since .

Exponentiation is noncommutative, since . This property leds to two different "inverse" operation of exponentiation (namely, the nth-root operation and the logarithm operation), which is unlike the multiplication.

Truth functions

Some truth functions are noncommutative, since the truth tables for the functions are different when one changes the order of the operands.

Function composition of linear functions  	
Function composition of linear functions from the real numbers to the real numbers is almost always noncommutative. Then

and

This also applies more generally for linear and affine transformations from a vector space to itself (see below for the Matrix representation).

Matrix multiplication

Matrix multiplication of square matrices is almost always noncommutative, for example:

Vector product

The vector product (or cross product) of two vectors in three dimensions is anti-commutative; i.e., b × a =  −(a × b).

History and etymology

Records of the implicit use of the commutative property go back to ancient times. The Egyptians used the commutative property of multiplication to simplify computing products. Euclid is known to have assumed the commutative property of multiplication in his book Elements. Formal uses of the commutative property arose in the late 18th and early 19th centuries, when mathematicians began to work on a theory of functions. Today the commutative property is a well-known and basic property used in most branches of mathematics.

The first recorded use of the term commutative was in a memoir by François Servois in 1814, which used the word commutatives when describing functions that have what is now called the commutative property. The word is a combination of the French word commuter meaning "to substitute or switch" and the suffix -ative meaning "tending to" so the word literally means "tending to substitute or switch". The term then appeared in English in 1838. in Duncan Farquharson Gregory's article entitled "On the real nature of symbolical algebra" published in 1840 in the Transactions of the Royal Society of Edinburgh.

Propositional logic

Rule of replacement 
In truth-functional propositional logic, commutation, or commutativity refer to two valid rules of replacement. The rules allow one to transpose propositional variables within logical expressions in logical proofs. The rules are:

and 

where "" is a metalogical symbol representing "can be replaced in a proof with".

Truth functional connectives 

Commutativity is a property of some logical connectives of truth functional propositional logic. The following logical equivalences demonstrate that commutativity is a property of particular connectives. The following are truth-functional tautologies.

Commutativity of conjunction
Commutativity of disjunction
Commutativity of implication (also called the law of permutation)
Commutativity of equivalence (also called the complete commutative law of equivalence)

Set theory 
In group and set theory, many algebraic structures are called commutative when certain operands satisfy the commutative property.  In higher branches of mathematics, such as analysis and linear algebra the commutativity of well-known operations (such as addition and multiplication on real and complex numbers) is often used (or implicitly assumed) in proofs.

Mathematical structures and commutativity
 A commutative semigroup is a set endowed with a total, associative and commutative operation.
 If the operation additionally has an identity element, we have a commutative monoid
 An abelian group, or commutative group is a group whose group operation is commutative.
 A commutative ring is a ring whose multiplication is commutative. (Addition in a ring is always commutative.)
 In a field both addition and multiplication are commutative.

Related properties

Associativity

The associative property is closely related to the commutative property.  The associative property of an expression containing two or more occurrences of the same operator states that the order operations are performed in does not affect the final result, as long as the order of terms does not change. In contrast, the commutative property states that the order of the terms does not affect the final result.

Most commutative operations encountered in practice are also associative. However, commutativity does not imply associativity. A counterexample is the function

which is clearly commutative (interchanging x and y does not affect the result), but it is not associative (since, for example,  but ). More such examples may be found in commutative non-associative magmas. Furthermore, associativity does not imply commutativity either - for example multiplication of quaternions or of matrices is always associative but not always commutative.

Distributive

Symmetry

Some forms of symmetry can be directly linked to commutativity.  When a commutative operation is written as a binary function  then this function is called a symmetric function, and its graph in three-dimensional space is symmetric across the plane . For example, if the function  is defined as  then  is a symmetric function.

For relations, a symmetric relation is analogous to a commutative operation, in that if a relation R is symmetric, then .

Non-commuting operators in quantum mechanics

According to the uncertainty principle of Heisenberg, if the two operators representing a pair of variables do not commute, then that pair of variables are mutually complementary, which means they cannot be simultaneously measured or known precisely. This is the same example except for the constant , so again the operators do not commute and the physical meaning is that the position and linear momentum in a given direction are complementary.

See also

Anticommutative property
Centralizer and normalizer (also called a commutant)
Commutative diagram
Commutative (neurophysiology)
Commutator
Parallelogram law
Particle statistics (for commutativity in physics)
Proof that Peano's axioms imply the commutativity of the addition of natural numbers
Quasi-commutative property
Trace monoid
Commuting probability

Notes

References

Books 

Abstract algebra theory.  Covers commutativity in that context.  Uses property throughout book.

Linear algebra theory.  Explains commutativity in chapter 1, uses it throughout.

Abstract algebra theory.  Uses commutativity property throughout book.

Articles

Article describing the mathematical ability of ancient civilizations.

Translation and interpretation of the Rhind Mathematical Papyrus.

Online resources

Krowne, Aaron, Accessed 8 August 2007.
Definition of commutativity and examples of commutative operations
, Accessed 8 August 2007.
Explanation of the term commute
 , Accessed 8 August 2007
Examples proving some noncommutative operations

Article giving the history of the real numbers

Page covering the earliest uses of mathematical terms

Biography of Francois Servois, who first used the term

Properties of binary operations
Elementary algebra
Rules of inference
Symmetry
Concepts in physics
Functional analysis